Jann Oddvar Sørdal (17 October 1920 – 18 September 1996) was a Norwegian footballer who played for Freidig. He was capped five times for the Norway national football team in 1948, scoring five goals.

Career statistics

International

International goals
Scores and results list Norway's goal tally first.

References

1920 births
1996 deaths
Footballers from Trondheim
Norwegian footballers
Norway international footballers
Association football forwards